Aweyden may refer to:
the German name of Nawiady, Poland
Aweiden, former quarter of Königsberg, Prussia